Timothy Jamin Quilty is an Australian politician. He was a Liberal Democratic Party member of the Victorian Legislative Council between 2018 and 2022, representing Northern Victoria Region. He was not successful in his re-election to the Legislative Council in the 2022 state election.

Before his election to parliament, he served as a LDP Councillor on the Wodonga City Council, previously contesting the Division of Indi for the LDP in the 2016 Australian federal election, as well as the seats of Eden-Monaro in 2004 and 2007 and Riverina in 2010.

Prior to entering politics, Quilty was a farmer and an accountant.

References

Year of birth missing (living people)
Living people
Liberal Democratic Party members of the Parliament of Victoria
Members of the Victorian Legislative Council
21st-century Australian politicians